La Chaîne Info (LCI; English: "The News Channel") is a French free-to-air news channel. It is part of TF1 Group.

History
LCI was launched on 24 June 1994 by Christian Dutoit on behalf of the media group TF1 as a pay television channel. Its launch was also simulcast on TF1.

The broadcast began at 8:30 pm with the live TV news programme presented by Françoise-Marie Morel. The first guest was the CEO of the channel, Étienne Mougeotte.

The channel was also broadcast in Italy alongside TF1 on digital terrestrial television from 2004 to December 2006 on Dfree multiplex.

In 2006, the channel's website appeared twice in the James Bond film Casino Royale, a product placement that the channel says it did not pay for..

On 5 April 2016, the channel became free-to-air and began broadcasting on channel 26 via digital terrestrial television in France.

Since October 2022, LCI, as well as the free DTT channels of the TF1 group, have been accessible free to air, via the Astra 1 satellite. This broadcast follows a temporary interruption in encrypted broadcasting to Canal+ and TNTSAT subscribers. , following a commercial dispute. However, despite the resumption of encrypted broadcasts within the Canal+ and TNTSAT bouquets, this free-to-air broadcasting continues. LCI is therefore received free of charge in almost all of Continental Europe.

Programs

Current programs 
 LCI Matin, weekday morning news program presented by François-Xavier Ménage and Amandine Bégot (anchors the news), also Audrey Crespo-Mara anchors a political interview and La Vie des Idées.
 La Médiasphère, a technology program, hosted by Christophe Moulin.
 LCI et vous, late-morning news program, hosted by Bénédicte Le Chatelier.
 LCI Midi, midday news program, hosted by Philippe Ballard and Marie-Aline Méliyi.
 Le 15/18, afternoon drive news program by Magali Lunel.
 24 heures en questions, roundup, hosted by Yves Calvi + Magali Lunel (weekdays) and Bénédicte Le Chatelier (Saturday).
 Le grand soir, late news program hosted by Julien Arnaud and Rebecca Fitoussi, replaced LCI Soir.
 LCI Matin Week-end, weekend morning news program hosted by Sébastien Borgnat and Sylvia Amicone.
 LCI Journée Week-end, weekend block programming from 10am to 6pm by Julien Dommel.
 LCI Soir Week-end, weekend block programming from 6pm to midnight by Damien Givelet and Julie Hammett.
 Le Grand Jury, a political/economic interview program hosted by Olivier Mazerolle, Alexis Brezet et Christophe Jakubyszyn.
 Le grand journal de 12h - weekend newscasts at noon.

Current magazines 
 Tout un monde
 Au cœur de la course
 Le Live Présidentiel
 24 heures, la semaine en questions
 Au cœur de nos différences
 Au cœur des régions
 Politiquement Show

Former programs 
 Le grand journal de 12h30
 Le grand journal de 18h
 Le grand journal de 18h30
 Le 14/17
 Le 14/16
 Le 17/20
 Le 17/19
 Le 12/14
 Le 18/20
 Questions d'actu
 Le journal du monde
 Le Club LCI
 LCA, La Culture Aussi

Slogans 
 1994-2012: "L'information continue sur LCI" (Continuous news on LCI)
 2012-2015: "Mieux que savoir, comprendre" (Better than knowing, understanding)
 2016-Now: "Vous êtes au cœur de l'info" (You are at the heart of the news)

References

External links
Official website 

Television channels and stations established in 1994
1994 establishments in France
French-language television stations
Television stations in France
24-hour television news channels in France